The Right to Love is a 1920 American silent drama film directed by George Fitzmaurice. It stars Mae Murray, David Powell and Holmes Herbert. The film is based on the French novel L'Homme qui assassina, by Claude Farrère and the play of the same name by Pierre Frondaie. A copy of the film is preserved in the Nederlands Filmmuseum.

Plot
As described in a film magazine, summoned in her desperation to help her in her anguish at the threatened separation from her child, American soldier Colonel Richard Loring (Powell) is witness to the blackguard conspiracy of Lord Archibald Falkland (Herbert) to dishonor his wife. Lady Falkland (Murray) married the English ambassador to Turkey to satisfy her father's greed for wealth, and was a youthful sweetheart of Loring's in America. Their romance was shattered by her enforced marriage to the Ambassador, who insists on keeping in their home in Constantinople his mistress Lady Edith (Tell), an English woman. These two plot the compromise of the wife in a situation with Prince Cerniwicz (Harlam) and her separation from her boy Little Archibald (Johnson), and the outcome is the murder of Lord Falkland by the Colonel. Because of a remembered obligation, a Turkish nobleman (Losee) throws the guilt from Loring and the two lovers are reunited.

Cast
Mae Murray as Lady Falkland
David Powell as Colonel Richard Loring
Holmes Herbert as Lord Archibald Falkland
Alma Tell as Lady Edith
Frank Losee as Marshal to the Sultan
Macey Harlam as Prince Stanislaus Cerniwicz
Marcia Harris as Governess
Lawrence Johnson as Little Archibald

See also
Stamboul (1931)
The Man Who Murdered (1931)

References

External links

 
 
 Right to Love at ThoughtEquity

1920 films
1920 drama films
Silent American drama films
American silent feature films
American black-and-white films
Famous Players-Lasky films
Films based on French novels
American films based on plays
Films directed by George Fitzmaurice
Paramount Pictures films
Films based on adaptations
Films with screenplays by Ouida Bergère
1920s American films